Chivalry & Sorcery Sourcebook 2 is a 1981 role-playing game supplement for Chivalry & Sorcery published by Fantasy Games Unlimited.

Contents
Chivalry & Sorcery Sourcebook 2 contains texts and charts for resolving different contingencies in C&S.

Reception
Ronald Pehr reviewed Chivalry & Sorcery Sourcebook 2 in The Space Gamer No. 48. Pehr commented that "Any dissatisfaction with Sourcebook 2 is a mere quibble.  If you play C&S, Sourcebook 2 will markedly enhance your game. If you don't, it has limited utility."

Reviews
Different Worlds #22 (July, 1982)

References

Chivalry & Sorcery
Fantasy role-playing game supplements
Role-playing game supplements introduced in 1981